WQDD-LP (93.5 FM) was a radio station licensed to Girardville, Pennsylvania, United States. The station was owned by Golden Age Communications.

WQDD-LP's license was cancelled by the Federal Communications Commission on June 27, 2018, due to the station having been silent since September 26, 2016.

References

External links
 

QDD-LP
QDD-LP
Schuylkill County, Pennsylvania
Radio stations established in 2006
2006 establishments in Pennsylvania
Defunct radio stations in the United States
Radio stations disestablished in 2018
2018 disestablishments in Pennsylvania
QDD-LP